The Andrés Montoya Poetry Prize Competition is a biennial program of Letras Latinas in collaboration with the University of Notre Dame Press. Founded in 2004, the Latino poetry competition seeks to publish the first collection of a promising Latino-American poet who has not previously published a book of poetry.

Honoring Andrés Montoya 
The award is named in honor of Andrés Montoya, a Chicano poet. Montoya passed away from leukemia in 1999 before the publication of his book, The Iceworker Sings and Other Poems. That collection would later go on to win the 1997 UC Irvine Chicano/Latino Literary Prize and the before Columbus 2000 American Book Award. Bilingual Press issued a second printing of the book in 2017. 2019 will mark the 20th anniversary since its publication.

Founder and Coordinator 
In his role as director of Letras Latinas, the literary initiative at the Institute for Latino Studies at the University of Notre Dame, Francisco Aragón founded the Prize in 2004 and serves as its coordinator.

Past winners

See also
List of poetry awards

References

External links
 Information on the prize from the Institute of Latino Studies
 Andrés Montoya Poetry Prize

Awards established in 2004
Awards honoring Hispanic and Latino Americans
Hispanic and Latino American literature
American poetry awards
2004 establishments in Indiana
Awards and prizes of the University of Notre Dame